Carlsdotter is a Swedish patronymic name.  People known by this name include the following:

Elizabeth Carlsdotter Gyllenhielm (1622-1682), Swedish royal
Görwel Christina Carlsdotter Gyllenstierna (1646-1708), Swedish noblewoman
Lisbeth Carlsdotter, a child witness in the 1675 Stockholm witch trials
Sissa Carlsdotter, Swedish single mother of Godfrey Gummer Goodwin, Representative from Minnesota

See also

Karlsdotter

Norwegian-language surnames
Swedish-language surnames